Hugh O'Neil (sometimes referred to as J. O'Neill)  was an American professional baseball player who played pitcher for the 1875 Brooklyn Atlantics.

External links

Brooklyn Atlantics players
19th-century baseball players
Major League Baseball pitchers
Baseball players from New York (state)
Date of birth missing
Date of death missing